Vilina Vlas was a rape camp active during the Bosnian War. It served as one of the main detention facilities where Bosniak civilian prisoners were beaten, tortured and murdered and the women raped by prison guards during the Višegrad massacres in the Bosnian War of the 1990s. It is located about four kilometers north-east of Višegrad, in the village of Višegradska Banja.

After the war, Vilina Vlas was re-opened as a tourist facility. The local authorities have actively opposed a memorial and suppressed mention of their atrocities in the once primarily Muslim region.

The camp 
In 1992 the concentration and rape camp at the Vilina Vlas hotel was one of the Višegrad area's main detention facilities. It was established by the Uzice Corps at the end of April 1992 and played a significant role in the ethnic cleansing of the area's non-Serb population. The hotel served as a camp "brothel". Bosniak women and girls, including many not yet 14 years old, were brought to the camp by police officers and members of the paramilitary groups the White Eagles and Arkan's and Vojislav Šešelj's men.

Milan Lukić, leader of a local group of paramilitaries referred to variously as the White Eagles, the Avengers or the Wolves, established his headquarters at the Vilina Vlas Hotel, one of various locations where local Bosniaks were detained. The group, with ties to the local  police and Serb military units, played a prominent role in the ethnic cleansing of Višegrad, committing numerous crimes including murder, rape, torture, beatings, looting and destruction of property.

Many rapes in the Višegrad area were allegedly perpetrated in an apparently systematic fashion. Reports to the United Nations Commission of Experts to the Security Council (the Bassiouni Commission) state that victims were rounded up and transported to places like Vilina Vlas and the Hotel Višegrad apparently for the purpose of being detained and raped.

One report to the Bassiouni Commission estimated that 200 women, primarily Bosniak, were detained at Vilina Vlas and sexually assaulted. The hotel was known as a place where only young, beautiful women were detained and in testimony given to the Bassiouni Commission it is claimed that women brought to this camp had been chosen to bear "Chetnik" children and were "selected" carefully. It was claimed that younger girls were taken to the hotel while older women were taken to other locations, such as occupied or abandoned houses, and raped. The number and consistency of the reports were considered to provide reasonable confirmation that a large number of rapes did in fact occur at the hotel.

The prisoners were raped repeatedly and beaten with batons. Many of the women were killed while others were exiled, became insane or took their own lives. Only a handful of the women prisoners survived – fewer than ten according to the Association of Women Victims of War, an organisation which works with women survivors and campaigns for the prosecution of the perpetrators.  Most of the women prisoners were either killed or took their own lives. The bodies of the victims have not been found and are alleged to have been buried in concealed locations and then reburied.

During the Sjeverin massacre, 16 Bosniaks were abducted by Milan Lukić while travelling on a bus from Serbia to Bosnia and were taken to Vilina Vlas, where they were tortured and murdered.

The camp was eventually closed once its existence became known outside Bosnia and the surviving detainees removed to an unknown fate.

Trials
Milan Lukić was found guilty of having executing detainees kept at the camp. He was not charged with rape despite them being well documented. The President of the Association of Women Victims of War, Bakira Hasečić, has severely criticised the International Criminal Tribunal for the former Yugoslavia at The Hague for failing to include rape among the charges against Milan Lukić when he was brought to trial. One woman survivor reported Lukić raping her several times while she was a prisoner at the hotel.

Oliver Krsmanović was charged with the rape and grave sexual abuse of female Bosniak detainees at Vilina Vlas as well as for the massacre of 70 Bosniaks in the village of Bikavac.

Risto Perišić, Chief of Police and Crisis Staff member, is alleged to have aided in the torture, rape, and execution of detainees at Vilina Vlas. Duško Andrić, the director of Vilina Vlas, was reported as having been one of the perpetrators of rape at the hotel. Duško Andrić is a pensioner still living in Višegrad. He has never been charged with any offenses.

Art and culture

A stay at Vilina Vlas during a visit to Višegrad inspired the Australian performance artist Kym Vercoe's work "seven kilometres north-east: A performance about geography, tourism and atrocity". In 2013 a film by Jasmila Žbanić and Kym Vercoe For Those Who Can Tell No Tales was released. It shows how the horrific crimes committed against women in Vilina Vlas are being swept under the carpet even today, as the perpetrators remain unpunished and the hotel operates as if nothing had happened.

See also
Bosnian Genocide
Milan Lukić
Bakira Hasečić
Dretelj camp
Gabela camp
Heliodrom camp
Keraterm camp
Manjača camp
Omarska camp
Trnopolje camp
Uzamnica camp
Vojno camp

References

External links
Final Report of the Commission of Experts Established Pursuant to Security Council Resolution 780 (1992) (United Nations Security Council S/1994/674 - 27 May 1994) - Annex VIII - part 1/10 Prison camps - 85. Visegrad (includes section on Vilina Vlas)
UNHCR Convention on Civil and Political Rights - Human Rights Committee Document CCPR/C/89, dated 27 April 1993, Bosnia and Herzegovina Report (extensive documentation of war crimes committed in Višegrad and surrounding areas)
"THE RAPES IN BOSNIA: A BOSNIAC SCHOOLGIRL'S ACCOUNT" by Peter Maass, in The Washington Post, December 27, 1992
"Visegrad Rape Victims Say Their Cries Go Unheard" by Nidzara Ahmetasevic, Nerma Jelacic and Selma Boracic – Institute for War and Peace Reporting Balkan Insight, 18 October 2006 (BIRN report on the ICTY's failure to bring charges in relation to the use of the Vilina Vlas spa hotel as a rape camp)
International Criminal Tribunal for the Former Yugoslavia Latest Developments (link to Press Kit for Milan Lukic and Sredoje Lukic proceedings)
"Lukic Murdered 410 Bosniaks and One Serb!" by Edina KAMENICA, in Oslobodjenje (Sarajevo), March 22, 2001 (report of "Merjem"'s experience at Vilina Vlas ; in collection of 2001 articles from Oslobodjenje).
"Abduction" B92 programme by Veran Matic (transcript of television report on the abduction of a group of Bosniak men from Sjeverin who were detained at Vilina Vlas before being executed on the orders of Milan Lukic).
"Vilina Vlas, The Fairy's Hair", TV documentary about the Vilina Vlas rapings by Sotiris Danezis for the "Warzone" programme (Mega Channel, Greece) (in Greek).
People & Power - Bosnia's broken promises (Al-Jazeera).
Jasmina Ahmetspahic (28.01.1968 – 14.06.1992)

1992 establishments in Bosnia and Herzegovina
Bosnian genocide
Serbian concentration camps in the Yugoslav Wars
Wartime sexual violence
Serbian war crimes in the Bosnian War
Bosnian War internment camps